Old Norse has three categories of verbs (strong, weak, & present-preterite) and two categories of nouns (strong, weak). Conjugation and declension are carried out by a mix of inflection and two nonconcatenative morphological processes: umlaut, a backness-based alteration to the root vowel; and ablaut, a replacement of the root vowel, in verbs.

Nouns, adjectives and pronouns are declined in four grammatical cases – nominative, accusative, genitive and dative, in singular and plural. Some pronouns (first and second person) have dual number in addition to singular and plural. The nouns have three grammatical genders – masculine, feminine or neuter - and adjectives and pronouns are declined to match the gender of nouns. The genitive is used partitively, and quite often in compounds and kennings (e.g.: Urðarbrunnr, the well of Urðr; Lokasenna, the gibing of Loki). Most declensions (of nouns and pronouns) use -a as a regular genitive plural ending, and all declensions use -um as their dative plural ending.

All neuter words have identical nominative and accusative forms, and all feminine words have identical nominative and accusative plurals.

The gender of some words' plurals does not agree with that of their singulars, such as lim and mund.

Morphophonology

Conditioned sound changes can cause some forms of a word to mismatch, or match in some words but not others. When speakers can't determine these conditions, but the effects remain, they are re-analyzed by speakers as rules for changing sounds during inflection, the morphophonology of the language. In this way, the history of a language affects its speakers.

During Proto-Germanic

Verner's law shifted Proto-Germanic /*h/ > /*g/ after an unstressed syllable. Afterwards, stress shifted to the first syllable in all words. In many Old Norse verbs, a lost /g/ reappears in the forms of some verbs, which makes their morphology abnormal, but remain regular because the forms containing /g/s are the same for each verb they appear in.
ex.: Proto-Germanic *slōhúm > *slōgúm (we struck) had an unstressed first syllable, but the corresponding singular, *slṓh (I struck), had only a stressed syllable. These became Old Norse slógum and sló.:1

Before Old Norse

Umlaut was originally an assimilation of root vowels to suffixes having the front phonemes  (i-umlaut) and the back phonemes  (u-umlaut) in Proto-Germanic. The suffixes were not on all forms of the same words, so when the suffixes underwent syncope during the transition into Old Norse, the remaining umlaut of the vowel indicated what the suffix had before. From then on speakers would alternate the vowel as an act of inflection.

Verbs

Verbs are conjugated in person and number, in present and past tense, in indicative mood, imperative, and subjunctive mood. There are elements of repetition and minor variation in the inflections, but the type of verb also determines which patterns are present. The subjunctives show the largest and widest spread pattern among the inflections, with both strong and weak classes ending subjunctives (past and present) with ek/þú/þat -a/-ir/-i, vér/þér/þau -im/-ið/-i, except for a minor variation in the 3rd, 4th and 5th strong conjugations.

The active participle is used to form a gerund or a verbal noun with weak masculine singulars but strong masculine plurals in r, or else with weak neuter declension. As a plain participle, it is a weak adjective. The participle appears in two genders within the same verse in Hávamál: "gínanda úlfi / galandi kráku." The general sense of the noun is of the English suffix -er or of being able to perform the action. The plural as a prefix, ęndr-, is equivalent to the English and Latin prefix re-.

The case of the object of an Old Norse verb is lexically assigned, meaning that the case is determined on a per-verb basis. Most verbs take an accusative object, but some, such as gefa (give) have primary and secondary objects in the accusative and dative, while still others have nominative, genitive, or dative direct objects.

Strong verbs

Strong verbs, unlike weak verbs, are conjugated by ablaut, a process that replaces, rather than modifies, their root vowel. The English sing uses ablaut to conjugate to sang in the past tense and sung as the past participle. Like weak verbs, strong verbs use inflections and umlaut, but they rely on them much less to distinguish forms and conjugations. While the strongs' umlaut and inflectional patterns are largely the same from verb to verb, there are different sets and numbers of vowels involved in ablaut, and so their patterns are used to classify the strong conjugations.

If there are 2 vowels in the pattern (as in the 6th & some 7th conjugation patterns), the 2nd is used for all the past forms. If there are 3, the 2nd vowel is used for the indicative past singulars, & the 3rd for the other past tenses. The 1st vowel is used for the remaining forms: the infinitive, present forms, and imperative, and usually the past participle of 3-vowel words. However, some 3-vowel words have a 4th vowel appearing only in the participle.

The past participle of strong verbs follows the pronominal declension of hit, though unlike the definite suffix the participle is inherited from Proto-Germanic.

The 3rd, 4th and 5th conjugations have an i, rather than an a, in the 1st person subjunctive past ending. Third conjugation words ending in n, g, or k have a u for their past participles' root vowel. The jas of the 3rd conjugation are due to breaking. The 4th and 5th conjugations are identical except in the past participle, where the 4th conjugation normally has o and the fifth conjugation e. Generally, 3rd conjugation stems have two consonants following the vowel; 4th conjugation stems have a single sonorant consonant (l, r, m or n) following the vowel; and 5th conjugation stems have a single consonant that is not a sonorant.

The 6th conjugation is cognate with English's take/took/taken conjugation. The 7th conjugation is a heterogenous category. Its ablaut patterns include a/á, e/é; au, jó; a, jó, jo; and ý, jó, ú.

Verbs in -ra

The -ra conjugation consists of strong verbs with weak preterites that use an r rather than a dental in their inflection. These arose as contractions of reduplicated verbs. They correspond to modern Icelandic ri-verbs. When the pre-contraction form of the verb contained a velar, it persisted in the past indicative plurals, past subjunctives, and past participle, and the verb assumed the characteristics (ablaut, inflection) of normal strong conjugation. Alternate, regularized past-tenses for these were also in use in some dialects, with an -ø-r or -e-r format. Verbs like kjósa and snúa follow the ú/jú/jó, au, u, (o) ablaut pattern, and verbs like slá follow the a, ó ablaut.

The forms of slá without the g have absorbed said consonant, lengthening the vowel in the process. When this process is taken into account, the conjugation can be seen as that of a regular verb with an a, ó ablaut pattern. The -ø-r past tense forms were used in some dialects, with sløri and sløru as attested forms, but was rare in writing.

Weak verbs

Weak verbs distinguish the tenses of the indicative and subjunctive primarily by adding a suffix with a dental (t, d, or ð). This is the primary mode of distinction of tenses, in contrast with the radical vowel changes characteristic of the strong verbs. Preceded by the dental, the subjunctive past tense endings take the form of their present tense endings, changing the inflectional vowel to i in the plural. The indicative forms take the subjunctive forms, changing the inflectional vowel to u in the plural. The dental is preceded by an a in some verbs, causing the past tenses to become trisyllabic.

There are three primary conjugations, corresponding approximately to the first three classes of weak verbs in Gothic. The Proto-Germanic and Gothic Class IV weak verb, with a *-n(ō)- suffix, has been incorporated into the second conjugation in Old Norse.

First conjugation
The first weak conjugation has an -i/j- suffix, which triggers i-umlaut of the stem. As in other Germanic languages, there are two subclasses, depending on whether the stem is short (consisting of a short vowel followed by at most one consonant) or long (containing a long vowel or diphthong, or followed by two or more consonants). The differences are due to Sievers' law, which caused the suffix to assume the form *-j- after short syllables but *-ij- after long syllables. The long *-ij- suffix subsequently disappeared when followed by a vowel that remained in Old Norse (except after k, g or a vowel, as in fylgja "to follow"), but betrays its former presence by i-umlauting the stem syllable.

When the stem was directly followed by a consonant, it was vocalized, becoming *-i- after short syllables and *-ī- after long syllables. Short *-i- was lost early on in many circumstances, before the operation of i-umlaut; as a result, short-stem verbs lack i-umlaut in the indicative past and the past participle. Umlaut does occur in the subjunctive past of the short-stem verbs, either as a result of the -j/ī- that originally occurred in the subjunctive endings or by analogy with the strong verbs. (Contrast Gothic, where the -i- stem is still preserved, and Old English, where i-umlaut operated early enough that all first-weak verbs, both short and long, have consistent i-umlaut throughout the paradigm.)

Many 1st conjugation verbs are derived by i-umlaut of the second ablaut form of a strong verb, often serving as a causal equivalent to it. (This derives directly from the Proto-Indo-European causative-iterative construction.) For example, bręnna — to make burn derives from brenna/brinna (ek brann, þau brunnu) — to burn; be burning. The -ing & -ingr suffixes are added to a finite form of some of these verbs to derive feminine and masculine nouns from them. The -ning & -ningr can also be used to derive feminine and masculine nouns in short-stem verbs, and are added to a non-umlauted form of the verbs, e.g. spurning "a question" from spyrja "to ask".

Short-stem verbs

Long-stem verbs

Second conjugation
The second conjugation is marked by a consistent -a- suffix, with no i-umlaut. It contains a class of derivates with characteristic suffixes: inchoatives in -na, such as vakna; causals in -ga from adjectives in -igr; causals in -ka; iteratives in -sa; verbs in -la, a kind of diminutive; and verbs in -ja, -va, and -ra. The -n suffix is applied to the infinitive of some of these verbs to derive feminine nouns from them. The inflections containing ǫð (see table) may spell and pronounce the ǫ as a reduced u or an a depending on the dialect.

Third conjugation
The third conjugation is generally marked by an -i- in the present tense, and no suffix in the past tense. This -i- does not trigger i-umlaut, as it derives from Proto-Germanic *-ai-. However, subjunctive preterites do have i-umlaut, either as a result of the *-j/ī- that originally occurred in the subjunctive endings or by analogy with the strong verbs.

Present-preterite verbs

Present-preterite, or present-in-past, verbs form their present tenses using the ablaut patterns of strong verbs' past tenses. Their past tenses are formed like weak verbs'.

Suffixes and clitics

The reflexive pronoun's accusative, sik, is contracted and suffixed to the verb as -k, -sk, or -zk in order to form the reflexive suffix. This suffix is often referred to as Old Norse's "middle voice." In the early 13th century, the suffixes became -z and -s, and later -zt and -zst. As a middle voice, it can be thought of as passivizing an action without using passive voice syntax. This usage of reflexivity is paralleled in English with sentence pairs such as "he sat down" and "he sat himself down."

Nouns

Old Norse and other Germanic languages had two types of regular declension. They are called the strong and weak declensions by analogy with the strong and weak conjugations. These declensions are further subdivided into stem classes: groups of nouns distinguished by the historical or present morphophonological characteristics that the nouns of each class's stems share(d). Their names take after their Proto-Germanic or Proto-Indo-European ancestors, and refer to the suffixes present on those older nouns. Because umlaut was caused by these suffixes, there is a strong correlation between the phonetic characteristics of the suffix and the type of umlaut seen among stems of a class. Besides the latter classification, the stems may be grouped into the root noun, consonant stem, and vocalic stem declensions, in Proto-Germanic terms.

In Proto-Germanic, the neuter stems modeled their nominative/accusative singulars after masculine accusative singulars, while their nominative/accusative plurals were modeled after the nominative singular of the corresponding feminine declension.

Strong nouns

Old Norse has 2 strong neuter declensions, and 3 strong masculine and feminine declensions. The masculine and feminine declensions may be referred to as the a, i, and r declensions, after their nominative plural inflections of -ar, -ir, and -r, respectively.

Though the a-declension masculines tend towards a genitive -s, and the i- and r-declension words towards -ar, many words are found going against the norm. Grautr, skógr, and hǫfundr, for example, are a-declension nouns with -ar for a genitive singular. The -i of the dative singular is frequently dropped from many words, particularly in the i-declension. Bisyllabic proper names in -arr (Einarr) or -urr (Gizurr) do not contract as hamarr does before an inflectional syllable, due to differing etymologies. The following words demonstrate two PIE o-stem reflexes, one bisyllabic, a yo-stem reflex, and an iyo-stem reflex. The latter stem type consists mainly of poetic words.

Among the i-declension masculines are the wa-stem reflexes. These have a u-umlauted root caused by a radical v.

The strong feminines descend from PIE ā stems.  PIE -ā developed into PGmc. -ō and finally Proto-Norse -u, leading to the singulars of these words being u-umlauted under that inflection's influence. Their plurals are the same as those of the analogous masculine declension, except for the nominative and accusative being the same. The ending -ir of the i-stems, as in tíð - tíðir, while not exemplified in the table below, is in fact more common in feminines than the ending of ō-stems -ar, and has become increasingly so by analogy; thus the example gjǫf in the table in later texts replaces its old plural form gjafar with gjafir. A dative singular u inflection is found in some nouns, most noticeably in the i-declension where it is sometimes accompanied by an accusative singular u. Some nouns, prominently among nouns in the same declension as ęrmr, carry a nominative singular r inflection; surprisingly, these are the descendants of the Proto-Germanic ijō-stems (i.e. long jō-stems, as opposed to the short counterpart seen below in the example Hęl), which historically lacked that ending; it seems that they have acquired it through confusion with the i-stems such as tíð, which did originally have it. Conversely, the i-stems have lost the nominative -r ending through analogy with ō-stem feminines. Finally, many nouns do not have any inflectional distinctions among the singulars except from the genitive. Under these circumstances the case system aligns with that of most English nouns, e.g.: "A mouse's (G) mouse (N) gave a mouse (A) to a mouse (D)." or Latin neuter u-stems (with the additional ablative and vocative cases also being identical). e.g.: "Cornūs (G) cornū (N), quod cornū (D) ērat, cornū (Ac) cum cornū (Ab) frēgit. Cornū (V)!" ("A horn's horn, that belonged to a horn, broke a horn with a horn. O horn!")

The neuter declensions' genitive and dative mirror the masculine a declension's. The nom./acc. plural is u-umlauted from the singulars, but this only alters nouns with a as their root, leaving number indistinct in many strong neuters for these cases. PGmc -ja stem reflexes, such as nęs and klæði, are umlauted without regard to stem weight.

Weak nouns

One main feature of weak nouns is that they do not distinguish the non-nominative singular cases from each other. This effectively forms a nominative-oblique case dynamic confined to the weak singulars. Historically, the Proto-Germanic weak nouns were characterized by a nasal suffix applied as a case marker. These were mostly absorbed by their preceding vowels by the time Old Norse developed, with the main exceptions being those suffixes in the weak feminine and neuter declensions' genitive plurals. As a result, weak nouns are referred to as the n stems, a consonant stem class.

The plural inflection of the weak masculine declension is that same as the strong masculine a declension. The weak declension contains the endings -ingi and -yrki/-virki, as well as some weak versions of strong masculine nouns, names, and endings.

The weak feminines with the -a ending vary greatly in the genitive plural, but most fall into a few groups: Nouns with -na as ending; nouns with no genitive plural; nouns that form the genitive plural by attaching the definite article's genitive plural to the nominative singular; nouns whose genitive singular is used collectively.

As the nominative of neuter words is also the accusative, and as weak nouns have the same dative and genitive as accusative in the singulars, all of the singular forms are the same for the weak neuters. One subset of the neuter declension contains 6 nouns for parts of the body. Another contains words for objects, forming no genitive plural.

The Indeclinable Feminines are an additional class of weak noun which originally had a word stem with the ending -in of which in Old Norse only the -i remains. They are conceptual in meaning, and because of this have no plurals and do not differentiate case. The word lygi "lie" however has a plural. They may, in charts, be included with the feminines in -a, in which case said chart becomes:

Pronouns and adjectives

Pronouns and adjectives are generally separate in declension. However, in semantic and syntactic usage, the boundary is less clear-cut. Adjectives may be used as in English, to modify a noun (e.g., gótt vatn, good water), or may stand alone as a de facto pronoun (e.g., gótt, a good thing). The only difference in their declensions is the masculine accusative singular ending, which is -n in pronouns and -an in adjectives. Genitive and dative plurals are indistinct in gender for all pronominal and adjectival declensions. The nominative and accusative neuter singular ends in -t when the word's root vowel is short, and -tt when long.

Pronouns

The interrogatives include hvat "what", hví "why", and hvess "what sort", derived from þat, hvar "where" and hveim "whom", derived from þar, hvárt "which of two, each," and hvęrt, "whether, which of many."

There are two relative particles, er or es and sem, which can also be used as relative pronouns or adverbs. Both are completely indeclinable. The former carries the relative (non-interrogative) senses of the words which, who, when, where, and that. The latter corresponds to as, as if, alike, same as, or about the same time as, and may take on any function of er as well.

Some pronouns, such as hvárr, hvęrt, nekkvęrt, and sá, have adjectival function. This usage generally requires a different translation than their pronominal one.

Personal and possessive

Þat's singulars follow the pronominal declension irregularly, and with different lemmata for each gender. Its plurals follow the declension of the cardinal numbers irregularly, and are especially similar to tvau's forms. Variants of hánum include honum and hǫnum.

For the 1st and 2nd person, actions with one's self as an object simply use mik, þik, etc. For the 3rd person, a separate reflexive pronoun is used, which follows the declension of the 1st and 2nd personal pronouns' singulars.

* Tvau "two" or bœði "both" may be used as substitute for a true 3rd personal dual.

The possessive pronouns are derived from the genitives of the personal pronouns. They are mitt, þitt, sitt, okkart, ykkart, várt, and yðart. The í of those derived from the singulars is shortened before nn or tt.

Adjectives

The comparative and superlative forms are formed by inserting -r- and -st- or -ar- and -ast- between the uninflected form of the adjective and a strong or weak ending. In the strong adjectives, the definite and superlative are strong when indefinite, weak when definite. The comparatives are weak when both definite and indefinite, and are declined like the active participle. Some strong adjectives i-umlaut their root vowel in their comparatives and superlatives, so that stórt hús (a large house) becomes stœrst (a house most large). The past participles of weak verbs decline as strong adjectives.

Hit

As the definite article, hit appears before a definite adjective and suffixed to a noun.<ref name="CleasbyHinn" group="cv">{{harvnb|Cleasby|Vigfússon|1874|loc =pp.262-3 "Hit/hinn/hin}}</ref> Double definiteness occurs when hit/hinn/hin or the other definite article, þat/sá/sú, is used before a definite noun or adjective, e.g. "sá konungrinn," "inn hvíti." This type of construction persists to some extent in all modern North Germanic languages, though not generally in Icelandic.

 When suffixed, it gives the nouns pronominal declension (like itself). The h is always dropped, and the root i is replaced by any vowel at the end of the noun. The early dative plural uminum is contracted to unum in West Norse, and umin in East Norse. In other uses, it can appear before an adverb, after a pronoun, between two nouns, or between an adjective and a pronoun (including another adjective).

The hit originally appeared always as a separate word, hit/hinn/hin, it/inn/in, or et/enn/en, placed before or after a noun or adjective, with the /h/ elided due to the word appearing unstressed in most or all positions. In the late 14th century (particularly in Old Norwegian), an indeclinable form was popular, inu or hinu, but at no other time.

A related word, hitt, should not be confused with hit, as they are distinct in meaning and stress, and in that the h can never be dropped from hitt.

Strong declensionJarpt demonstrates the general case for declension. Gótt displays dental assimilation, while nekkvęrt demonstrates pronominal declension. The comparative and superlative follow the weak declension.

Weak declension and weak inflection of active participles

The singulars of the weak adjectival declension are modelled after those of the weak noun declensions (-an- and -on-stems), and likewise have a nominative-oblique case dynamic.

The active participle and comparative only have a weak declension and are in masculine and neuter modelled after the weak nouns with roots in -an-stems, but in feminine and plural modelled after the weak nouns with roots in -in-stems. The comparative form as in Latin, other Germanic languages etc. is also corresponding to the agent noun-ending, which in Old Norse has a weak declension with roots in -an-stem inflection as well.

The plurals are not distinguished in gender, nor in case except the dative.

Indeclinable
The indeclinable adjectives end in -i, -a or -s. They are not comparable. They originated either from regular weak adjectives, with the different endings marking gender; or adjectives with a noun ending in genitive plural or singular, as they originally were nouns.

Numbers

Eitt (one) follows the pronominal declension, and hundrað is a strong neuter noun.Tvau, bæði, þrjú, and fjǫgur have only plural, and their declension is given below. The background of the inflection tveimr and þrimr in the dative case as seen below is the Proto-Germanic noun and adjective dative and instrumental plural ending -maz and -miz. Those endings are still used in contemporary Icelandic today. All other cardinal numbers are indeclinable.

The distributives and multiplicatives are all strong adjectives. The ordinals are weak, except for annat "the second", which is strong and fyrst "the first", which can be both.

See also

 Old Norse
 Old Swedish Grammar
 Old Norwegian Grammar
 Old Danish Grammar
 Proto-Germanic grammar

References

Cleasby-Vigfússon dictionary

Sources

 
e-text via the Germanic Lexicon Project (lexicon.ff.cuni.cz)

 
 

 
scanned document via "Germanic Lexicon Project" (lexicon.ff.cuni.cz)
e-text via norroen.info  
 , facing translation
 

 
 
 
alt source via "Germanic Lexicon Project" (lexicon.ff.cuni.cz)

External links
 Alaric’s Magic Sheet'' paradigm chart.

North Germanic grammars
Morphology